David Grace (born 5 May 1985) is an English professional snooker player and painter. After being a successful junior and amateur player, notably winning the English Amateur Championship in 2005 and 2008, he became a professional in 2008, gaining his place by winning the 2008 European Snooker Championships, where he beat Craig Steadman in the final.

In 2009, Grace took part in the men's singles snooker competition at the World Games in Kaohsiung, finishing as the runner-up in this event, winning the silver medal. He entered the 2015 UK Championship as the world number 81, but progressed through to his first ranking event semi-final which he lost 6–4 to Liang Wenbo. Grace fell off the tour in 2018, but regained his place on the tour in 2019 after finishing in the top two on the 2018–19 Challenge Tour ranking list. This earned him a two-year card for the 2019/2020 and 2020/2021 seasons.

Career

2011/2012 season
As a new player on the tour Grace would need to win four qualifying matches in order to reach the main draw of the ranking events. He failed to win more than one match in each of his first six attempts to do this until he played in the qualifying for the China Open. There he beat Daniel Wells, Barry Pinches and Matthew Selt, before losing 4–5 to Tom Ford in the final round.

Grace played in all 12 of the minor-ranking Players Tour Championship events throughout the season, with his best finishes coming in Event 10 and Event 12, where he reached the last 16. He was ranked 63rd in the PTC Order of Merit. Grace ended the season ranked world number 77 and would ordinarily be relegated from the snooker tour as he did not finish in the top 64 who retain their places. However, due to his performances in the PTC events, he earned his place for the 2012–13 season.

2012/2013 season
Grace reached the final round of qualifying for the 2012 Shanghai Masters after seeing off Michael Leslie, Li Yan and Xiao Guodong, but was edged out 4–5 by former world champion Peter Ebdon just one match away from reaching the main stage of a ranking event for the first time. He played in all ten Players Tour Championship events this season, where he enjoyed his best result in the PTC Event 1 by beating James Gillespie, Jimmy White and Gareth Allen, before losing to Jack Lisowski. Grace was placed 74th on the PTC Order of Merit. His season ended when he was beaten 9–10 by Craig Steadman in the first round of World Championship Qualifying. Grace fell 11 places in the rankings during the year to finish it world number 88.

2013/2014 season
Grace went one better than last season in the qualifying rounds of the 2013 Shanghai Masters by winning four matches, concluding with a 5–2 victory over Tom Ford, to reach the main stage of a ranking event for the first time in his career where he was whitewashed 5–0 by Barry Hawkins. He lost his first match in all eight remaining ranking events after this. Grace also had his best form in the early part of the season in the European Tour events by reaching the last 16 of the second event, the Rotterdam Open, where he was beaten 4–1 by Mark Davis. This helped him to finish 53rd on the Order of Merit, which saw Grace earn a fresh two-year place on the tour for the 2014–15 and 2015–16 seasons.

2014/2015 season
At the minor-ranking Yixing Open, Grace won three matches to reach the last 16 where he was whitewashed 4–0 by Ryan Day. Grace qualified for the first ranking event of the 2014–15 season, the Wuxi Classic by beating Jimmy Robertson 5–4, but he lost 5–1 to Judd Trump. This last 64 appearance proved to be his best result in a ranking event this year.

2015/2016 season
In the qualifying rounds for the 2015 Shanghai Masters, Grace beat Joe O'Connor 5–3, Thepchaiya Un-Nooh 5–2 and Cao Yupeng 5–4 to reach the final round. He faced Ali Carter and defeated him 5–3, a victory he described as the best of his career afterwards. Grace was due to play Mark Selby in the first round, but he received a bye after Selby withdrew due to family bereavement. In the second round Grace was knocked out 5–1 by Mark Allen. At the UK Championship, Grace defeated Andrew Higginson 6–1, Robert Milkins 6–2, Jack Lisowski 6–4 and Peter Ebdon 6–2 to reach the quarter-finals of a ranking event for the first time in his career. He fell 5–1 down to Martin Gould, but remarkably won five successive frames to eliminate him 6–5. In the semi-finals, Grace built a 4–2 advantage over Liang Wenbo, but saw it erased to be 5–4 behind. He then missed a simple pink in the next frame which would have taken the match to a decider, stating afterwards that he had twitched on it. Despite this, Grace earned £30,000 for his first last four showing after he had made £13,000 in the previous two seasons. His form continued into the Gibraltar Open where he won four matches to meet Liang in the quarter-finals and was beaten 4–1. However, Grace could only win two out of nine matches during the rest of the season which included making his debut at the World Grand Prix (lost 4–2 to Mark Allen in the first round). Grace finished a season inside the top 64 in the world rankings for the first time as he was 60th.

2016/2017 season
At the Paul Hunter Classic, Grace beat Sean O'Sullivan 4–0 and Matthew Stevens 4–3 and then did not drop a frame in eliminating Jack Lisowski and Robbie Williams. This saw him play in his second career ranking event quarter-final in which he led Thepchaiya Un-Nooh 3–1, but lost 4–3. Grace was beaten 4–1 by Barry Hawkins in the third round of the English Open and lost in the quarter-finals of the Shoot-Out to Shaun Murphy.

Grace then qualified for his first World Championship by overcoming Thor Chuan Leong 10–6, Mark Joyce 10–6 and Akani Songsermsawad 10–3 and played Kyren Wilson in the first round. Grace only trailed 5–4 at the end of the first session after being 5–1 down and then made a century to be 7–6 behind. However, Wilson then took three successive frames to win 10–6. His end-of-year ranking of 44 is the highest Grace has ever been.

2017/18 season
He dropped off the tour at the end of the 2017/18 season but entered Q School in an attempt to win back a place. However, his bid to regain professional status ended unsuccessfully, as he lost in all three 2018 q school events.

Personal life
Grace also works at the Northern Snooker Centre and sells his own portrait paintings of snooker players to make extra money.

Performance and rankings timeline

Career finals

Non-ranking finals: 1

Pro-am finals: 3 (2 titles)

Amateur finals: 5 (5 titles)

References

External links

 
 
 Profile on Global Snooker
 David Grace at worldsnooker.com
 Global Snooker News Article
 Snooker Men Draw World Games 2009

1985 births
Living people
Snooker players from Leeds
World Games silver medalists
Competitors at the 2009 World Games